2021–22 Syed Mushtaq Ali Trophy (also known as Paytm Syed Mushtaq Ali Trophy due to sponsorship reasons) was the fourteenth edition of Syed Mushtaq Ali Trophy, a Twenty20 competition that was played in India. It started on 4 November 2021, with the final taking place on 22 November 2021. The tournament formed part of the 2021–22 Indian domestic cricket season, which was announced by the Board of Control for Cricket in India (BCCI) in July 2021. Tamil Nadu were the defending champions.

The tournament was originally scheduled to be started on 20 October 2021, and postponed to 27 October 2021, but eventually started on 4 November 2021. The teams were initially divided into five groups, with seven teams each in Groups A and B, and eight each in Groups C, D and E. However, in August 2021, the BCCI announced that the tournament would be divided into six groups, with six teams in the five Elite Groups, and eight teams in the Plate Group. The winners of each Elite Group progressed directly to the quarter-finals, with the second-placed teams and the winner of the Plate Group playing in pre-quarters matches to determine the final eight teams. It was played in six cities across the country which are Baroda, Delhi, Guwahati, Haryana, Lucknow, Vijayawada, with all the knockout matches played in Delhi.

On 8 November 2021, in the Plate Group match between Vidarbha and Manipur, Akshay Karnewar of Vidarbha became the first bowler to bowl four overs in a Twenty20 cricket match without conceding a run.

Tamil Nadu, Gujarat, Bengal, Hyderabad and Rajasthan all won their Elite Groups, advancing to the quarter-finals, with Maharashtra, Kerala, Karnataka, Saurashtra, Himachal Pradesh and Vidarbha progressing to the preliminary quarter-finals. Vidarbha, Karnataka and Kerala all won their preliminary quarter-final matches to reach the quarter-finals of the tournament. In the quarter-finals, Tamil Nadu, Vidarbha, Hyderabad and Karnataka all won their matches, with Karnataka winning a Super Over against Bengal.

In the first semi-final match, defending champions Tamil Nadu beat Hyderabad by eight wickets, after Hyderabad were bowled out for 90 runs. In the second semi-final, Karnataka scored 176/7 from their twenty overs against Vidarbha, winning by four runs to join Tamil Nadu in the final. In the final, Tamil Nadu beat Karnataka by four wickets to win the tournament and retain their title.

Player transfers
The following player transfers were approved ahead of the season.

League stage

Group A

Group B

Group C

Group D

Group E

Plate Group

Knockout stage

Preliminary quarter-finals

Quarter-finals

Semi-finals

Final

References

External links
 Series home at ESPN Cricinfo

Syed Mushtaq Ali Trophy
Syed Mushtaq Ali Trophy
Syed Mushtaq Ali Trophy, 2022-22